John Pettes (March 17, 1793 - March 24, 1868) was a businessman and public official who was active in Windsor, Vermont.  Among the offices in which he served were Sheriff of Windsor County (1837-1839) and United States Marshal for the District of Vermont (1849-1853).

Early life
John Pettes was born in Amherst, Massachusetts on March 17, 1793, a son of Joseph Pettes (1757-1811) and Charlotte (Wales) Pettes (1761-1849).  Joseph Pettes moved his family to Windsor, Vermont in 1800, where he operated a coffee house and hotel.  After his death, Charlotte Pettes took over management of the business, which she operated until the early 1840s.

Business career
After the Pettes family's move to Vermont, John Pettes was educated in the schools of Windsor, then became the operator of a general store in Windsor, which he owned in partnership with his brother Frederick.  Pettes also became active in the Vermont Militia; in 1820, he was first lieutenant of the Jefferson Artillery, a Windsor battery commanded by Allen Wardner with the rank of captain.  Pettes advanced through the militia's officer grades to become a major in a Windsor-area unit, and afterwards was frequently addressed by his rank.

Among the other ventures Pettes pursued in addition to the store were an ownership stake in the Cornish–Windsor Covered Bridge, a wool brokerage partnership, real estate sales, serving on the board of directors of the Bank of Woodstock, importing and reselling foreign goods transported to Vermont via steamboat on the Connecticut River, an interest in a fire insurance company, and owning and managing a family farm.  In 1833, he was one of the incorporators of the Ascutney Mill Dam Company.  In 1845, he was an original incorporator of the Vermont Railroad Iron Company, which manufactured rails and other railroad train and track components.

Murder of Homer Cooper
In June 1842, the family of John Pettes was reported on in newspapers throughout the United States in connection with a murder that took place on the Pettes farm.  According to contemporary newspaper accounts, a crew of laborers including several of Pettes's sons and a man named Peter McCue were working on the farm.  The group included Pettes's son Frederick Dudley Pettes, who was about 11 years old, and a local African American boy, Homer Cooper, who was four.  As the adults left the field where they had been working, McCue told the group he was going to return and provide additional assistance to the boys.  Instead, he attacked them with two hoes.  Both boys were severely injured, but Frederick Pettes was able to run for help.  McCue fled by attempting to swim to the New Hampshire side of the Connecticut River, but drowned before he reached the shore.  Cooper later died as the result of his injuries.  Frederick Pettes recovered, served as Deputy U.S. Marshal for Vermont during his father's term as Marshal, and later owned and operated the family farm.

Public official
A Whig, Pettes was active in Vermont's politics and government.  He served as Sheriff of Windsor County from 1837 to 1839.  In 1849, he was appointed United States Marshal for the District of Vermont, succeeding Jacob Kent Jr.  He served until 1853, and was succeeded by Charles Chapin.

Later life
For many years, Pettes suffered from a tumor which started near a place on his neck where he had been injured after he was thrown from a horse and impaled on a fence.  The tumor negatively affected his breathing and disfigured his face, and in his later life Pettes became a near-recluse as a result.  In 1867, his hip and leg were broken when the horse he was attempting to bridle knocked him down, after which he was confined to his bedroom.

Death and burial
Pettes died in Windsor on March 24, 1868.  He was buried at Old South Cemetery in Windsor.

Family
In 1820, Pettes married Lucy Richards (1799-1849) of Dorchester, Massachusetts.  They were the parents of seven children who lived to adulthood:

 William R. (1821-1881)
 Mary E. (1823-1841)
 John Jr. (1825-1866)
 Edward C. (1829-1877)
 Frederick D. (1831-1907)
 Robert T. (1833-1867)
 Lucy E. (1834-1911)

References

Sources

Newspapers

Internet

Books

External links
 

1793 births
1868 deaths
People from Amherst, Massachusetts
People from Windsor, Vermont
American militia officers
Vermont Whigs
Vermont sheriffs
United States Marshals
Burials in Vermont
Military personnel from Massachusetts